Grass Root Film Company is an Indian film production and distribution company. Established by Indian director Vetrimaaran in 2012, it debuted with Udhayam NH4, produced in collaboration with Meeka Entertainment. The company has collaborated with Wunderbar Films on several other films. Committed in 2012, it has since gone to produce several Tamil language films.

Filmography

References

2012 establishments in Tamil Nadu
Indian film studios
Film production companies based in Chennai
Producers who won the Best Children's Film National Film Award